The following is a list of awards and nominations received by English actor Helen Mirren, whose career has spanned five decades, with recognition for her work in film, television, and on stage.

Among her major competitive awards, Mirren has won one Academy Award, four BAFTA Awards, three Golden Globe Awards, four Primetime Emmy Awards, a Children's and Family Emmy Award, and one Tony Award. Mirren is one of few actresses to have achieved the Triple Crown of Acting, which is competitive Academy Award, Emmy Award, and Tony Award wins in the acting categories. She has also received numerous honorary awards, including the BAFTA Fellowship,  SAG Life Achievement Award and Gala Tribute presented by the Film Society of Lincoln Center.

Film awards

Academy Awards
1 win out of 4 nominations

British Academy Film Awards
1 win out of 5 nominations

British Independent Film Awards
1 nomination

Critics' Choice Movie Awards
2 wins out of 3 nominations

European Film Awards
1 win out of 2 nominations

Evening Standard British Film Awards
1 win out of 1 nomination

Golden Globe Awards
1 win out of 8 nominations

Golden Raspberry Awards
1 nomination

Independent Spirit Awards
1 nomination

Satellite Awards
2 wins out of 7 nominations

Saturn Awards
3 nominations

Screen Actors Guild Awards
3 wins out of 8 nominations

Major critics award wins

Major Festival awards

Television awards

British Academy Television Awards
3 wins out of 6 nominations

Emmy Awards
5 wins out of 12 nominations

Golden Globe Awards
2 wins out of 8 nominations

Satellite Awards
2 wins out of 7 nominations

Screen Actors Guild Awards
2 wins out of 5 nominations

Theatre awards

Drama Desk Awards
1 win out of 2 nominations

Olivier Awards
1 win out of 4 nominations

Tony Awards
1 win out of 3 nominations

Miscellaneous awards

Other achievements

Honours
Mirren was invested as a Dame Commander of the Most Excellent Order of the British Empire (DBE) in the 2003 Birthday Honours for services to drama. When she received the honour, Mirren commented that Prince Charles was "very graceful", but forgot to give her half of the award. Another person had to remind him to give Mirren the star. She also said that she felt wary about accepting the award, and had to be persuaded by comrades to accept the damehood. In 1996, she had declined appointment as a Commander of the order (CBE).

Further recognition

Hollywood Walk of Fame
On 3 January 2013, Mirren received a star on the Hollywood Walk of Fame, located at 6714 Hollywood Boulevard, in front of the Pig 'n Whistle, and joked about her star's proximity to that of The King's Speech actor Colin Firth, stating: "I couldn't be prouder and more happy that I'm actually going to finally lie next to Colin Firth, something I've been wanting to do for a very long time."

Honorary degrees
Dame Helen Mirren has been awarded several honorary degrees, in recognition of her acting career and her promotion of educational and charitable initiatives. These include:

References

Mirren, Helen